Early presidential elections were held in Armenia on 3 March 2022, following President Armen Sarkissian's resignation on 23 January 2022.

Background 
In accordance with Article 124 of the amended Constitution, a non-partisan president will be elected for a seven-year, non-renewable term. In accordance with Article 125, the candidate that receives at least three fourths of votes of the total number of deputies of the National Assembly will be elected President of Armenia. If the president is not elected, a second round is held wherein all candidates who took part in the first round may participate. In the second round, the candidate that receives at least three fifths of votes of the total number of deputies will be elected as President of the Republic. If a president is still not elected, a third round of elections will be held wherein the two candidates who received a greater number of votes in the second round may participate. In the third round, the candidate who receives the majority of votes of the total number of deputies will be elected.

According to Article 125 of the constitution, at least one fourth of the total number of deputies of the National Assembly shall have the right to nominate a candidate for president. This means that at least 27 members of parliament must back the respective candidate in order for that candidate to be officially nominated. Thus, in the case of a wide consensus, a candidate may very well run unopposed since minority parties with less than 27 members in the National Assembly will not be able to nominate a candidate.

Eligibility 
According to the amended constitution, everyone who has reached the age of forty, held citizenship of only Armenia for the preceding six years and permanently resided in Armenia for the preceding six years, has the right of suffrage, and speaks the Armenian language may be elected as President of the Republic.

Candidates 
The ruling Civil Contract party (71 seats) and the primary opposition Armenia Alliance (29 seats) met the 27 seat requirement to nominate a presidential candidate. However, the junior opposition I Have Honor Alliance only has 6 seats and cannot nominate a candidate by itself.

Opposition boycott 
The Armenia Alliance and I Have Honor Alliance of the National Assembly announced they had decided “not to participate in the presidential election in any way.” The two opposition alliances said in a joint statement, “The Constitution of Armenia demands that the President of the Republic be impartial, guided by national interests. Although the institution of the President should act as a truly neutral institution uniting the society, the government in power has decided to nominate and elect a President representing the ruling force only.” Noting that Armenia is facing serious internal and external challenges, the opposition MPs emphasized that “there is no alternative to national unity and public solidarity.”

Results

See also 
 Constitution of Armenia
 Elections in Armenia
 Government of Armenia
 Politics of Armenia

References 

Armenia
Armenia
Presidential elections in Armenia
2022 in Armenia
Single-candidate elections
March 2022 events in Armenia